Lord Williams may refer to:
John Williams, 1st Baron Williams of Thame (1500–1559), English Tudor courtier
Tom Williams, Baron Williams of Barnburgh (1888–1967), British Labour politician
Thomas Williams, 1st Baron Williams (1892–1966), British peer
Francis Williams, Baron Francis-Williams (1903–1970), British newspaper editor
Charles Williams, Baron Williams of Elvel (1933–2019), British Labour politician
Gareth Williams, Baron Williams of Mostyn (1941–2003), Welsh barrister and Labour cabinet minister
Michael Williams, Baron Williams of Baglan (1949–2017), British diplomat for the United Nations
Rowan Williams, Baron Williams of Oystermouth (born 1950), former Archbishop of Canterbury

Lady Williams may refer to:
Jane Williams, Lady Williams of Oystermouth (born 1957), English Anglican theologian and writer

See also
Marcia Williams, Baroness Falkender (1932–2019), private secretary to Harold Wilson
David Williamson, Baron Williamson of Horton (1934–2015), British and European civil servant